Costuleni is a village in Ungheni District, Moldova.

Notable people 
 Anatol Vidrașcu
 Igor Munteanu
 Octavian Țîcu

References

External links
 Reportaj EvZ
 pagina localității

Villages of Ungheni District
Populated places on the Prut